Gotthilf Heinrich Ernst Muhlenberg (17 November 1753 – 23 May 1815) was an American clergyman and botanist.

Biography
The son of Heinrich Melchior Muhlenberg, he was born in Trappe, Pennsylvania.  He was educated at Franckesche Stiftungen in Halle starting in 1763 and in 1769 at the University of Halle.  He returned to Pennsylvania in September 1770 and was ordained as a Lutheran minister.  He served first in Pennsylvania and then as a pastor in New Jersey. He received a Doctor of Divinity degree from Princeton University.

He married Mary Catherine Hall in 1774, with whom he would go on to have eight children. Despite his family beginning to take root in Philadelphia, Muhlenberg found he had no choice but to flee Philadelphia upon the outbreak of Revolutionary War hostilities in the region. Returning to his hometown of Trappe, he took up the study of botany.

He served as the pastor of Holy Trinity Church in Lancaster, Pennsylvania from 1780 through 1815. In 1785, he was elected as a member to the American Philosophical Society. In 1787, he was also made the first president of Franklin College. 1779 he retired and devoted himself to the study of botany. He is best known as a botanist. Muhlenbergia, a well-known genus of grasses, was named in his honor. His chief works are Catalogus Plantarum Americae Septentrionalis (1813) and Descriptio Uberior Graminum et Plantarum Calamariarum Americae Septentrionalis Indiginarum et Cicurum (1817).

Muhlenberg discovered and identified the bog turtle while conducting a survey of plants in Lancaster County, Pennsylvania. In 1801 the turtle was named Clemmys muhlenbergii in his honor, (with a common name of Muhlenberg's tortoise). However, the species' common name was changed to bog turtle in 1956, as the practice of naming an organism's common name after individuals became less popular.

In 1815, he suffered a paralytic stroke which hindered his activities. Helped by his daughter, however, Muhlenberg continued his correspondences until the sudden recess of his paralysis. Despite his condition seemingly reversing itself, a final series of strokes took his life not long after.

Muhlenberg is buried in Woodward Hill Cemetery in Lancaster, Pennsylvania.

Family
Muhlenberg was the brother of Frederick and Peter Muhlenberg, father of Henry A. P. Muhlenberg and Frederick Augustus Hall Muhlenberg, a physician, who was the father of Frederick Augustus Muhlenberg, the first president of Muhlenberg College.

Notes

References
  This work in turn cites:
 John M. Maisch, G. H. E. Muhlenberg als Botaniker (1886)
Solomon Erb Ochsenford. Muhlenberg College: A quarter-centennial memorial (1792) p. 172-173.
Attribution

External links

The Henry Ernest Muhlenberg papers, which contains scientific letters written to Muhlenberg, are available for research use at the Historical Society of Pennsylvania.

1753 births
1815 deaths
People from Trappe, Pennsylvania
19th-century American Lutheran clergy
Franklin & Marshall College
American botanists
American science writers
People from Lancaster County, Pennsylvania
American people of German descent
Muhlenberg family
Princeton University alumni
University of Halle alumni
Burials at Woodward Hill Cemetery
Members of the American Philosophical Society
18th-century American Lutheran clergy